Luiz Manella (born February 1, 1995 in Londrina, Brazil) is a Brazilian former competitive figure skater. He competed in the free skate at three ISU Championships – 2012 Four Continents in Colorado Springs, Colorado, United States; 2012 Junior Worlds in Minsk, Belarus; and 2013 Junior Worlds in Milan, Italy.

He moved to Miami when he was eight years old.

Programs

Results

References

External links 

 
 Luiz Manella at Tracings

Brazilian male single skaters
1995 births
Living people
Sportspeople from Londrina
Sportspeople from Miami
Brazilian emigrants to the United States